Bottovo is a village and municipality in the Rimavská Sobota District of the Banská Bystrica Region of Slovakia. In the village is gym hall, foodstuff store, public library and a football pitch.

External links
 
 
https://web.archive.org/web/20071116010355/http://www.statistics.sk/mosmis/eng/run.html
http://www.e-obce.sk/obec/bottovo/bottovo.html

Villages and municipalities in Rimavská Sobota District